At the Villa Rose is a 1930 British mystery film directed by Leslie S. Hiscott and starring Norah Baring, Richard Cooper and Northern Irish Actor Austin Trevor. It marked Trevor's screen debut. It was released in the United States under the alternative title of Mystery at the Villa Rose.

Production
The film is based on the 1910 novel At the Villa Rose by A.E.W. Mason  and features his fictional detective Inspector Hanaud. It was made at Twickenham Film Studios in St Margarets, Middlesex. A French-language version The Mystery of the Villa Rose was made simultaneously at Twickenham and the production was announced as being the first bilingual film made in Britain.

Cast
 Norah Baring as Celia Harland
 Richard Cooper as Mr. Ricardo
 Austin Trevor as Inspector Hanaud 
 Barbara Gott as Madame D'Auvray
 Francis Lister as Weathermill
 Amy Brandon Thomas as Mrs Starling
 Violet Farebrother as Helen
 John F. Hamilton as Mr Starling

Critical reception
The New York Times wrote, ""Mystery at the Villa Rose," a British audible film of A. E. W. Mason's novel, "At the Villa Rose," which is now at the Cameo, is baffling in more ways than one, for the vocal reproduction often is so "tubby" that it is not always possible to understand what the players are saying. The original story possessed possibilities for quite a good picture, but this screen effort has been handled so amateurishly that one really does not care who poisoned Madame D'Auvray."

References

Bibliography
 Richards, Jeffrey (ed.) The Unknown 1930s: An Alternative History of the British Cinema, 1929-1939. I.B. Tauris, 1998.

External links
 

1930 films
British mystery films
1930 mystery films
1930s English-language films
Films directed by Leslie S. Hiscott
Films shot at Twickenham Film Studios
British multilingual films
British black-and-white films
1930 multilingual films
1930s British films